SEK (Sidirodromoi Ellinikou Kratous, Hellenic State Railways) Class Λβ (or Class Lb; Lambda-beta) is a class of 16 2-10-0 steam locomotives, ex-WD Austerity 2-10-0s purchased after the Second World War.  All of them were previously stabled in Egypt and were transported to Greece, as part of the UNRRA mission in Greece (arrived at Thessaloniki port on 16 January 1946). They were given the class letters "Λβ" and numbers 951–966.

They were mainly allocated to the Salonika division, but hauled both freight and passenger trains (including Athens to Istanbul Expresses) all across Greece, until they were slowly replaced by diesel locomotives until the mid-1970s, being one of the last classes of steam locomotives of SEK to be withdrawn from regular service.

Preservation 

A total of eight Greek Austerity 2-10-0s survived the 1984-1985 steam locomotive scrappings, two of which were repatriated to Great Britain. Two continued to work tourist specials out of Drama until the mid-00s whilst the remaining four were left in open storage. Two are thought to have been scrapped in recent times, leaving just four survivors in Greece and the two repatriated examples.

* Name or number applied after preservation

References

WD Austerity 2-10-0
Λβ
2-10-0 locomotives
Steam locomotives of Greece
Railway locomotives introduced in 1952
Standard gauge locomotives of Greece